Tân Phú is an urban district of Hồ Chí Minh City, Vietnam. As of 2010, the district has a population of 407,924 and covers an area of  16 km². The district is divided into 11 small subsets which are called wards. It borders District 12 to the north, Tân Bình district to the east, Bình Tân district to the west, and District 6 and District 11 to the south.

The district was separated from Tân Bình district in December 2003. It consists of 11 wards: Tân Sơn Nhì, Tây Thạnh, Sơn Kỳ, Tân Quý, Tân Thành, Phú Thọ Hòa, Phú Thạnh, Phú Trung, Hòa Thạnh, Hiệp Tân and Tân Thới Hòa.

References

External links
Quận Tân Phú Official site.

Districts of Ho Chi Minh City